A Moment of Imperfect Clarity is the fourth album by the Christian rock band Spoken. It was their first to be released on Tooth & Nail Records.

Critical reception

Awarding the album two stars for AllMusic, Rick Anderson writes, "this is nothing more than solid, competent, and forgettable stuff." Scott Heisel, giving the album one and a half stars at Punknews.org, states, "Completely forgettable." Reviewing the album from Exclaim!, Sam Sutherland describes, "A Moment of Imperfect Clarity delivers on its promise — not perfection, but respite from the mirthless nature of so many of today's emo acts." Ben Lilford, rating the album a six out of ten from Cross Rhythms, says, " It doesn't deserve to but it will probably sell millions."

Indicating in a four star review by Christianity Today, Russ Breimeier describes, "Spoken makes a triumphant emotionally charged return on A Moment of Imperfect Clarity." Josh Taylor, signaling in a four star review at Jesus Freak Hideout, comments, "This is Spoken's best work to date, period." Assigning the album a five out of five for The Phantom Tollbooth, Len Nash replies, "Before people start to shun Spoken, taking some time to check out the new sound and reading some of the lyrics will allow the listener to make the best educated decision possible." Josh Marihugh, allocating a four and a half out of five review from The Phantom Tollbooth, responds, "While this CD may not be quite as musically groundbreaking as Echoes, it's definitely a fine album, full of well-crafted melodic modern rock and beautiful lyrics."

Track listing

References

Spoken (band) albums
2003 albums
Tooth & Nail Records albums
Albums produced by Garth Richardson